Robert Alexander Belfer (born 1935) is an American oilman and philanthropist who is known for his stake in Enron and is the namesake of Belfer Center for Science and International Affairs at Harvard Kennedy School.

Early life and education 
Belfer is the son of American oil industry executive and multimillionaire Arthur Belfer, who founded the Belco Petroleum Corporation and transformed it into a Fortune 500 company. He was born in Kraków, Poland in 1935 and graduated from Columbia College in 1955 and Harvard Law School in 1958.

Career 
After completing law school, Belfer joined the Belco Petroleum Corp. He was elected president in 1960 and was named its chairman in 1985. The company subsequently merged into one of the predecessors of Enron Corp, the Omaha, Nebraska-based InterNorth, Inc., and the Belfer family received a sizeable equity stake in the transaction, eventually becoming Enron's largest shareholder. What the family received was a special class of stock by which each share could be convertible into 27 common shares and paid big dividends. Belfer served the board of directors of Enron and was estimated to have held over 16 million Enron shares as of August, 2000. However, he was reported to be reticent on the board and was not involved in the operations of the company. He resigned from the board in June, 2002.

His shares earned him a spot on the Forbes 400. However, after the collapse of stock prices following the Enron scandal, the Belfer family holdings, valued at $661 million at the peak stock price of August 2000, were valued at just $6.3 million in 2001. The preferred shares he and his family owned in Enron would have been worth as much as $1.4 billion, according to analysts.

Nevertheless, prior to the Enron collapse, he had diversified into New York City real estate and founded a second energy company, Belco Oil & Gas Corp., in 1992. The company went public in 1996 through Goldman Sachs, raising more than $100 million. It was acquired by a Denver-based oil company in 2001.

Philanthropy 
In addition to his business ventures, Belfer is well known for his philanthropic endeavors. He is a major donor to the Metropolitan Museum of Art, where he founded the Robert and Renée Belfer Court for early Greek and prehistoric art in 1996. He also gave generously to John F. Kennedy School of Government, which named Belfer Center for Science and International Affairs after him in 1997. He also donated to Weizmann Institute of Science as well as the Israel Museum.

His philanthropic activities have focused on medical institutions. He donated to Yeshiva University, whose tallest building, Belfer Hall, was named after his family, and served as the chair of the board of overseers of the Albert Einstein College of Medicine. He also served on the board of Weill Cornell Graduate School of Medical Sciences, to which he donated $250 million over the years. The school's $100 million Belfer Research Building, dedicated in 2014, is named after him. Belfer sat on the board of directors of Dana–Farber Cancer Institute and donated $25 million to found the Robert A. and Renée E. Belfer Center for Applied Cancer Science.

He also was the founding donor for the Neurodegeneration Consortium, a multi-institutional collaboration to find treatments for Alzheimer's disease, which is based out of MD Anderson Cancer Center.

Belfer also endowed a professorship at Columbia University, the Robert and Renee Belfer Professor of International Relations, which is held by the political scientist Jack Snyder.

Personal life 
He is married to Renée E Belfer, and the couple has three children and five grandchildren. His daughter, Shelley Belfer, is married to Anthony Malkin, son of Empire State Building owner and lawyer Peter L. Malkin and grandson of Lawrence Wien.

References 

American business executives
Enron people
Columbia College (New York) alumni
Harvard Law School alumni
American Jews
American philanthropists
American businesspeople in the oil industry
American company founders
Living people
1935 births